Golden Triangle station is one of four light rail stations planned in Eden Prairie, Minnesota on the Southwest LRT extension of the Green Line. The "Golden Triangle" area surrounding the station is considered a regional employment center with more than 20,000 jobs and nearly 10 million square feet of industrial and office space. The Golden Triangle Station will be near the Performing Institute of Minnesota Arts High School and the station is positioned west of U.S. 169, east of U.S. Route 212 and north of I-494.

References

External links
Nine Mile Creek Engineering Design
Golden Triangle Station Engineering Design

Metro Green Line (Minnesota) stations
Railway stations scheduled to open in 2025
Railway stations under construction in the United States